Events from the year 1683 in art.

Events
 Last known dated work painted by David Teniers the Younger.

Paintings

 Cornelis Dusart - Fish Market
 René-Antoine Houasse - La Magnificence du Roi (ceiling painting in Salon de l’Abondance, Palace of Versailles)
 John Riley - Portrait of John Dryden

Births
December 4 - Shem Drowne, American coppersmith and tinplate worker (died 1774)
date unknown
Pietro Giovanni Abbati, Italian set designer, painter and engraver (died 1745)
Gao Fenghan, Chinese painter (died 1749)
Miyagawa Chōshun, Japanese painter in the ukiyo-e style (died 1753)
Ciro Adolfi, Italian painter (died 1758)
Domenico Brandi, Italian painter primarily of still lifes of birds and animals, as well as pastoral landscapes (vedute) (died 1736)
Bernardo de' Dominici, Italian art historian and painter (died 1759)
Giorgio Duranti, Italian painter of still lifes (died 1768)
Johan Georg Geitel, Finnish painter (died 1771)
Francesco Monti, Italian fresco painter (died 1768)
Francesco Polazzo, Italian painter of portraits and historical subjects (died 1753)
Anna Maria Thelott, Swedish engraver, illustrator, woodcut-artist, and miniaturist (died 1710)
1683-1685: Christian Friedrich Zincke, German miniature painter (died 1767)

Deaths
February 18 - Nicolaes Pieterszoon Berchem, Dutch painter of pastoral landscapes (born 1620)
March 11 - Giovanni Bernardo Carboni, Italian historical and portrait painter (born 1614)
June 12 - Tobias Pock, Austrian painter (born 1609)
June 7 - Giovanni Ghisolfi, Italian painter of vedute and capricci, mainly landscapes (born 1623)
?October - Philips Angel, Dutch painter (born 1616)
date unknown - Daniel Schultz, Dutch painter  (born 1615)
Guillaume Chasteau, French engraver (born 1635)
Daniel Schultz, Polish-Lithuanian painter (born 1615)
Willem van Aelst, Dutch artist (born 1627)
probable
Cornelis Norbertus Gysbrechts, Flemish painter of still life and trompe-l'œil (born 1630)
Jan van Almeloveen, Dutch painter, engraver, and draughtsman (born 1652)

References

 
Years of the 17th century in art
1680s in art